The Asia House Festival of Asian Literature, is the first and only Literary festival in the UK dedicated to writing about Asia.

The Festival focuses on the newest and best books about Asia or Asians in an annual series of talks and discussions. Featured are fiction and non-fiction, written by Asians or non-Asians, covering a broad selection of Asian countries from the Persian Gulf in the West, to Indonesia in the East.

Believing that the most accessible way to understand a culture is through its literature, The Asia House Festival of Asian Literature offers a forum for the people of Britain to gain greater understanding of Asian cultures and of the Asian communities around them at home.

Introduction and history
The first Asia House Festival of Asian Literature was held at Asia House in Central London, in May 2007. Founded by Adrienne Loftus Parkins, its current Director, it grew as a natural progression of an ongoing literature programme which has been running at Asia House since 2001. The Times has been the media partner of the Festival since its inception. The Festival is also supported by The National Lottery through Arts Council England. The Asia House produces the Festival in partnership with The Asian Word.

The Festival showcases both high-profile and emerging authors. Since its inception, the Festival has hosted authors such as:  veteran writer/broadcaster Sir Mark Tully, Man Booker Prize winners Kiran Desai and Aravind Adiga, Tash Aw, Pankaj Mishra, Xiaolu Guo, Romesh Gunesekera, Kamila Shamsie, Daniyal Mueenuddin, Nadeem Aslam, Mohsin Hamid, Mohammed Hanif, Sarfraz Manzoor, Michael Wood, Will Hutton, William Dalrymple, Amitav Ghosh, former UN Under-Secretary of State Shashi Tharoor, Xue Xinran, Amit Chaudhuri, Charles Allen, John Gittings, Chinese dissident writer Ma Jian, and Hardeep Singh Kohli.

Asia House Festival of Asian Literature

2010 Program

Festival features
Features include "Meet the Author" receptions after each event, Panel Discussions, Poetry, Podcast of all events, and a Children in Asia Series, .

Themes
Overall themes for 2010 relate to Change and Adaptation to 21st century issues, whether they be political, economic, social or cultural.

Debates and discussions in 2010 cover conflict in Kashmir, democracy and freedom in Asia, Afghanistan, migration and displacement, Persian Gulf economies, and the development of Pakistani fiction.

Authors
The Festival has grown to include events for both adults and children and encompassing music, travel, politics, business, cooking as well as fiction.
Authors appearing in 2010 are: Fatima Bhutto, William Dalrymple, Yasmin Alibhai-Brown, Janine di Giovanni, Chang-rae Lee, Atiq Rahimi, Peter Marsden, Daljit Nagra, Moniza Alvi, Imtiaz Dharker, Kavita Jindal, Hirsh Sawhney, Glen Peters, Diane Wei Liang, Michael Booth, John Kampfner, Humphrey Hawksley, Basharat Peer, Victoria Schofield, Justine Hardy, Jaspreet Singh, Neel Mukherjee, Tishani Doshi, Nitasha Kaul, Azadeh Moaveni, Persian Gulf experts Christopher Davidson and Jim Krane, Ali Sethi, Aamer Hussein, Francis Pike and 2008 Man Asian Prize winner Miguel Syjuco.

Children's authors and artists
Elizabeth Laird, Seema Anand, Nilesh Mistry and Prodeepta Das.

Dates
The 2010 Asia House Festival of Asian Literature ran from 5–27 May 2010 at Asia House. Pre Festival events took place in March, April and June, 2010.

2011 program

Authors
Colin Thubron, Zaiba Malik, Nikesh Shukla, Tahmima Anam, Ching-He Huang, Prajwal Parajuly, Wendy Law Yone, Moni Mohsin, Rachel Cusk, Mimi Khalvati, Ziba Karbassi, Stephen Watts, Mirza Waheed, Roma Tearne, Daisy Hasan, Tamara Chalabi, Ali Allawi, Angela Saini, Amanda Devi, Abdulrazak Gurnah, Tabish Khair, and Hanif Kureishi.

The 2011 Asia House Festival of Asian Literature will run from 10–26 May at Asia House.

Asia House
Asia House is the home of The Festival of Asian Literature. Founded in 1996, it is the leading Pan-Asian organisation in the UK. A non-profit, non-political body, its geographical remit extends from the Persian Gulf in the West to Indonesia in the East.

Its mission is to “engage with the Century of Asia” by promoting a greater understanding of the distinctive and varied cultures, arts, religions and commercial opportunities presented by the growing and vibrant countries of Asia.

Based in a listed John Adam style 18th century townhouse in Marylebone, Central London, featuring a Gallery, Library, Café, and three Fine Rooms, it provides a focal point for people to meet and exchange ideas.

References

External links
 Asia House's official website

Festivals in London
Literary festivals in England